George William "Wig" Pearcy (July 2, 1919 – September 14, 1992) was an American professional basketball player. He played in 37 games for the Detroit Falcons of the Basketball Association of America in the 1946–47 season. He recorded 94 points, 13 assists, and 68 personal fouls in his career. George is the older brother of Henry Pearcy, who also played for the Falcons that season.

BAA career statistics

Regular season

References

External links

 

1919 births
1992 deaths
American men's basketball players
American military personnel of World War II
Basketball players from Indiana
Detroit Falcons (basketball) players
Guards (basketball)
Indiana State Sycamores men's basketball players
People from Martinsville, Indiana
Paratroopers